Stephen Gaskin (February 16, 1935 – July 1, 2014) was an American counterculture Hippie icon best known for his presence in the Haight-Ashbury district of San Francisco in the 1960s and for co-founding "The Farm", a spiritual commune in 1970. He was a Green Party presidential primary candidate in 2000 on a platform which included campaign finance reform, universal health care, and decriminalization of marijuana. He was the author of over a dozen books, political activist, a philanthropic organizer and a self-proclaimed professional Hippie.

Life
Gaskin was born in Denver, Colorado and served in the US Marine Corps from 1952 to 1955. In the 1960s, he moved to San Francisco and taught English, creative writing, and general semantics at San Francisco State College, where he was a student of S. I. Hayakawa.

His writing class evolved into an open discussion group known as Monday Night Class, which involved up to 1500 students. Through 1968, the class was held at San Francisco State University Campus, later in "The Family Dog", an auditorium on the Great Highway on the land side of Ocean Beach on the shore of the Pacific Ocean in the Outer Richmond neighborhood of San Francisco. Gaskin spoke about his experiences with psychedelic drugs and paranormal experiences, and lectured about the importance of ecological awareness. This popular weekly gathering was attended by hippies from all over the San Francisco Bay Area during the years 1968–1970. Gaskin became known as San Francisco's acid guru.

In 1970, Gaskin and a caravan of 60 vehicles crossed the United States to settle 60 miles south-west of Nashville, Tennessee, forming a community called "The Farm", which the Wall Street Journal came to call "the General Motors of American Communes". This community was "a platform from which to launch efforts to improve the lot of poor and indigenous peoples, whales, and old growth trees". The Farm eventually transitioned to an intentional community in Summertown, Tennessee. For example, the community raised 1,200 earthquake-resistant homes and several public buildings and water lines in 5 villages in Guatemala, sent independent dosimetry teams after the Three Mile Island accident and the Chernobyl disaster, and gave the Rainbow Warrior equipment to escape from a Spanish harbor.

Gaskin went to prison in 1974 for marijuana possession, because some members of the community had planted several marijuana plants on the nearby "Martin farm" property, against his recommendation. This was a nearby property where the Caravan first "landed" in Summertown, before purchasing the initial 1200 acres of "the Farm". He served one year of a three-year sentence. After his release, his voting rights were rescinded. He brought a lawsuit challenging the legality of mass retroactive disenfranchisement under the Tennessee Constitution in the case Gaskin v. Collins. After winning in lower courts, the case went to the Tennessee Supreme Court and in 1981 returned voting rights to more than a quarter of a million convicts.

In Volume One: Sunday Morning Services on the Farm and earlier talks, Stephen Gaskin produced a substantial body of spiritual teaching. His ideas are now contained in books and tapes of the Sunday Morning Services which were published by the Book Publishing Company on The Farm. They speak of magic, energy and life in community as well as of service to humanity.

Gaskin was the first recipient of the Right Livelihood Award in 1980 (listed as Plenty International) and was inducted into the Counterculture Hall of Fame in 2004. He was awarded the Golden Bolt Award by The Farm Motor Pool (for helping buy a lemon semi), and won the Guru-Off (without even entering), racking up 77 points to Krishnamurti's 73.

Gaskin continued to work as an international activist, writer and speaker until a few months before his death. His topics ranged from humorous advice on all aspects of communal life and farming to modern communications, the counter-culture, spirituality, drug law reform, and social and ecological issues. He was a drummer in The Farm Band, an early Jam Band which toured in the 1970s and 1980s. His last published works were revised and annotated versions of Monday Night Class and The Caravan. He died on July 1, 2014, from natural causes, in his home, surrounded by family.

Bibliography
In order of first publication date.
   Copy available at the San Francisco State University Library.
   (original edition ©1970 by Book Farm and published by Book Farm, Santa Rosa, California.)
 
  This book was printed on low quality paper which deteriorated rapidly. A few copies are in library inventories.
 
 
 
 
 Earlier editions published as:
 
 
 
 
 Reprinted as

See also
 Alternative lifestyle
 Counterculture
 Counterculture of the 1960s
 Ina May Gaskin
 Plenty International

Notes

References

External links

 Interview with Stephen Gaskin by Stephen McKiernan, Binghamton University Libraries Center for the Study of the 1960s, May 13, 2010
 The Farm's website with more information on Stephen Gaskin.

1935 births
2014 deaths
Writers from San Francisco
Nonviolence advocates
American pacifists
American male writers
American cannabis activists
California Greens
Green Party of the United States politicians
United States Marines
People from Denver
Activists from California
San Francisco State University alumni